Rembów  is a village in the administrative district of Gmina Raków, within Kielce County, Świętokrzyskie Voivodeship, in south-central Poland.

The village has a population of 330.

References

Villages in Kielce County
Radom Governorate
Kielce Voivodeship (1919–1939)